Just In with Laura Ingraham was an American news program broadcast on the Fox News Channel weekdays at 5:00 p.m. Eastern Time. The show was hosted by conservative talk radio host Laura Ingraham. The show, said to be a limited trial run, lasted only three weeks on the air before being canceled; it was replaced by the same show that preceded it: America's Election Headquarters.

The show received significant public coverage shortly after its cancellation when a tape of off-air excerpts featuring Ingraham was leaked to the internet. In the nine-minute video Ingraham questions Fox News' style, and describes the show as a "train wreck."

See also 
The Ingraham Angle

References

External links
 

Fox News original programming
2000s American television news shows
2008 American television series debuts
2008 American television series endings